Selgas is one of fifteen parishes (administrative divisions) in Pravia, a municipality within the province and autonomous community of Asturias, in northern Spain.

The population is 68 (INE 2011).

Villages and hamlets
 Caliero (Calieiru)
 Selgas de Abajo (Selgas d'Abaxu)
 Selgas de Arriba (Selgas'Arriba)

References  

Parishes in Pravia